Sébastien Vieilledent (born 26 August 1976 in Cannes, Alpes-Maritimes) is a 2004 French rowing gold medallist. He won the gold medal alongside Adrien Hardy. He is currently coaching the French women's Olympic team.

References
 Photo

1976 births
French male rowers
Olympic rowers of France
Living people
Rowers at the 1996 Summer Olympics
Rowers at the 2000 Summer Olympics
Rowers at the 2004 Summer Olympics
Olympic gold medalists for France
Sportspeople from Cannes
Olympic medalists in rowing
Medalists at the 2004 Summer Olympics
World Rowing Championships medalists for France
21st-century French people